Triton Regional High School is a public high school in the village of Byfield within the town of Newbury, Massachusetts. Triton High also serves the nearby towns of Rowley and Salisbury.

Sports and extracurriculars
Home of the Vikings, Triton Regional High School teams sport the colors of blue and white, and competes within the Cape Ann League. The school has a co-op athletic partnership for swimming and track and field with Georgetown High School.

Fall Sports
Cross Country 
Soccer 
Field Hockey 
Football (2016 D3 North Sectional Champions) 
Volleyball  
Golf (2019 CAL Champions) 
Fall Play
Color Guard
Marching Band
Winter Sports
 Indoor Track and Field 
 Swimming and Diving (Co-Op with Newburyport) 
 Wrestling  
 Ice Hockey 
 Basketball 
 Skiing (Co-Op with Newburyport and Georgetown) 
 Winter Guard
 Winter Percussion 
Spring Sports 
 Outdoor Track and Field 
 Lacrosse (Co-Op with Georgetown)
 Softball (2019 CAL Champions)
 Baseball  
 Tennis 
 Spring Musical

See also
List of high schools in Massachusetts

References

External links

Cape Ann League
Educational institutions established in 1971
Schools in Essex County, Massachusetts
Public high schools in Massachusetts
Newbury, Massachusetts